The Major Works of John Coltrane is a compilation album by jazz musician John Coltrane, released in 1992 by GRP Records.  It features extended compositions, all recorded in 1965 with expanded ensembles, and originally released by Impulse! Records on Ascension, Om, Kulu Sé Mama, and Selflessness: Featuring My Favorite Things. Both editions of Ascension are included.

Reception

In a review for AllMusic, Steve Huey wrote: "The Major Works of John Coltrane compiles the saxophonist's most important extended free jazz pieces from 1965. This is the material that made Coltrane a giant of the avant-garde, completely casting off the limits of melody, harmony, and tonality that he'd been straining against... There's a lot to digest here, but as an encapsulation of Coltrane's freest and most challenging music, there's no better place to turn."

Writing for All About Jazz, Tim Niland commented: "This collection could more appropriately be called The Spiritual Works of John Coltrane, as Coltrane's spiritual quest informs all of the music found here. This is the sound of John Coltrane leaving Earth bound chordal jazz behind and lifting off to explore the cosmos of free jazz."

The authors of The Penguin Guide to Jazz Recordings awarded the album a full 4 stars and a "crown."

Track listing
Disc 1:
 "Ascension - Edition I" — 38:37
 "Om" — 28:49

Disc 2:
 "Ascension - Edition II" — 40:31
 "Kulu Se Mama" — 18:57
 "Selflessness" — 15:09

Personnel
Recorded June 28 and October 1965.

 John Coltrane — tenor saxophone
 Pharoah Sanders — tenor saxophone
 Archie Shepp — tenor saxophone (disc 1: track 1, disc 2: track 1)
 Marion Brown — alto saxophone (disc 1: track 1, disc 2: track 1)
 John Tchicai — alto saxophone (disc 1: track 1, disc 2: track 1)
 Freddie Hubbard — trumpet (disc 1: track 1, disc 2: track 1)
 Dewey Johnson — trumpet (disc 1: track 1, disc 2: track 1)
 Joe Brazil — flute (disc 1: track 2)
 Donald Garrett — clarinet/bass  (disc 1: track 2, disc 2: tracks 2,3)
 McCoy Tyner — piano
 Jimmy Garrison — bass
 Art Davis — bass (disc 1: track 1, disc 2: track 1)
 Elvin Jones — drums
 Frank Butler — drums  (disc 2: tracks 2,3)
 Juno Lewis — percussion/vocals  (disc 2: tracks 2,3)

Notes

References

1992 compilation albums
John Coltrane compilation albums
Impulse! Records compilation albums
GRP Records compilation albums